The Syracuse, Lake Shore and Northern Railroad, an interurban railway, was incorporated on September 9, 1905, after it was purchased by the Beebe Syndicate.

By 1911, the company had 13 fast electric limited trains leaving Syracuse daily for Baldwinsville, Phoenix, Fulton, Minetto and Oswego.

In 1917, the company was reorganized as the Empire State Railroad, also called Empire State Railway. Streetcar service on the route ran until 1931 when it was abandoned.

References

Defunct railroads in Syracuse, New York
Defunct New York (state) railroads
Railway companies established in 1905
Railway companies disestablished in 1917
Interurban railways in New York (state)
1905 establishments in New York (state)
American companies disestablished in 1917